Sharifabad Rural District is a rural district (dehestan) in Koshkuiyeh District, Rafsanjan County, Kerman Province, Iran. At the 2006 census, its population was 8,529, in 2,045 families. The rural district has 9 villages.

References 

Rural Districts of Kerman Province
Rafsanjan County